Barney & the Backyard Gang is an American direct-to-video series produced by The Lyons Group and released in periodic installments from August 29, 1988, to August 1, 1991. The series led to the launch of the children's television show, Barney & Friends, which in its original run aired on PBS from April 6, 1992, to November 2, 2010.

The first three episodes from 1988 and 1989 include Sandy Duncan as Michael and Amy's mother. (At the time, Duncan was starring on the NBC sitcom The Hogan Family.) Music for the Barney & the Backyard Gang videos was created by Stephen Bates Baltes and Phillip Parker (as with the television series), and Lory Lazarus wrote the first original song produced for Barney, "Friends Are Forever", sung by Duncan. In the first five videos, "I Love You" was sung at the beginning. Although "I Love You" was sung at the end of Barney Goes to School and Barney in Concert, and later frequently sung at the end of all episodes of Barney & Friends, it was not featured at the end of Rock with Barney.

The series was a regional success, but only a moderate success throughout the rest of the country. Then one day, in 1991, Larry Rifkin, then head of Connecticut Public Television, rented a Barney video for his daughter Leora. He liked the concept and talked to Leach about possibly putting Barney on television through the Public Broadcasting Service (PBS). Rock with Barney was the final video in the series before the television show debuted. Also, only four of the kids from the videos (Michael, Derek, Tina, and Luci) were carried over to the television show.

Video list
In order of release date:

 The Backyard Show (Pilot) (August 29, 1988)
 Three Wishes (December 10, 1988)
 A Day at the Beach (February 24, 1989)
 Waiting for Santa (May 11, 1990)
 Campfire Sing-Along (June 8, 1990)
 Barney Goes to School (August 15, 1990)
 Barney in Concert (July 29, 1991)
 Rock with Barney (Series Finale) (August 1, 1991)

Cast

 Baby Bop (Costume) - Dao Knight (1991-1992)
 Baby Bop (Voice) - Julie Johnson (1991-1992)
 Barney (Costume) - David Voss (1988–1990), David Joyner (1991)
 Barney (Voice) - Bob West (1988–1992)
 Adam - Alexander Jhin (1988–1991)
 Amy - Becky Swonke (1988–1991)
 Dad - Bob Reed (1988–1989)
 Derek - Rickey Carter (1990–1992)
 Jason - Salim Grant (1988–1989)
 Jeffrey - Jeffrey Lowe (1990)
 Luci - Leah Gloria (1988–1992)
 Michael - Brian Eppes (1988–1992)
 Mom - Sandy Duncan (1988–1989)
 Tina - Jessica Zucha (1988–1992)

Guest appearances
 Sandy Duncan (played Molly the Mermaid in A Day at the Beach)
 Jeanne Cairns (played Mrs. Claus in Waiting for Santa)
 Henry Hammack (played Santa Claus in Waiting for Santa)
 Sonya Resendez (played Tina's Mom in Campfire Sing-Along)
 Philip Parker (performed as the Bear in Campfire Sing-Along)
 Lauren King (played Kathy in Rock with Barney)
 Alexis Harris (played Jennifer in Rock with Barney)
 Ajay Reddy (played AJ in Rock with Barney)
 Chris Rodriguez (played Joseph in Rock with Barney)
 Lourdes Regala (played Adam's mother in Rock with Barney)

Syndication
The first six videos of this series aired on The Disney Channel in November 1990 as a part of its "Lunch Box" program.

See also
 List of Barney & Friends episodes and videos

References

1988 American television series debuts
1991 American television series endings
1980s American children's television series
1990s American children's television series
1980s preschool education television series
1990s preschool education television series
American preschool education television series
American television shows featuring puppetry
Barney & Friends
Direct-to-video television series
Television series about dinosaurs